The National Olympic Sports Centre or Olympic Sports Center Stadium is a multipurpose stadium in the Chaoyang District, Beijing, China. It is currently used mostly for soccer matches. It was constructed in 1986 for the 1990 Asian Games. The complex contains the main stadium, an indoor arena, a hockey field, and a natatorium.

It was renovated to host the 2008 Summer Olympics, where it hosted soccer matches and the running and riding parts of the modern pentathlon events. For the riding discipline, the soccer field at the core of the venue has been turned into a high-standard temporary equestrian field. The renovation also added four pavilion-styled rotating rampways around the stadium.

Its capacity has doubled after the renovation, from about 18,000 to 36,228.

Transport
It is served by Aoti Zhongxin (Olympic Sports Center) station on Line 8 of Beijing Subway.

References

External links
Page of Olympic Sports Center Stadium at Beijing2008.cn
Page of National Olympic Sports Centre at Chaoyang District Government Website

Football venues in Beijing
Sports venues in Beijing
Venues of the 2008 Summer Olympics
Olympic football venues
Olympic modern pentathlon venues
Multi-purpose stadiums in China
Venues of the 1990 Asian Games
World Rugby Sevens Series venues